The Space Under the Window is a 1997 interactive fiction game by Andrew Plotkin. The game is part of a collaborative art piece, also entitled "The Space Under the Window", by Kristin Looney (of Looney Labs) – each piece had to have this title, but was otherwise unconstrained.

This game uses an entirely different structure than that of traditional IF, veering away from score-based puzzles and one set goal. At the beginning, a short descriptive scene is displayed. Instead of entering commands, the player selects one of the words from the text, and the scene is altered - often subtly, for example, an addition of a few words or a shift in atmosphere. There are multiple paths along the narrative, and several endings ranging in mood.

The Space Under the Window was a finalist in the 1997 XYZZY Awards for Best Use of Medium and Best Writing. It has inspired parodies such as The Chicken Under The Window by Lucian P. Smith, at ChickenComp 1998.

External links 
Homepage
Play game in Javascript
Play game in Java
The Space Under the Window, an Electronic Book, created by Kristin Looney
Baf's Guide review of The Space Under the Window
The Space Under the Window – SPAG review by Duncan Stevens

1997 video games
1990s interactive fiction
Video games with alternate endings